Family history is the recording of the history of families.

Family history may also refer to:
Family history (medicine),  information about disorders from which the direct blood relatives of the patient have suffered
Family History (2006 film), a Canadian drama film directed by Michel Poulette
Family History (2019 film), a Philippine drama film directed by Michael V.
 "Family History", an episode of St. Elsewhere

See also
 History of the family, a branch of social history that concerns the sociocultural evolution of kinship groups